The Who Made Who Tour was a concert tour by Australian hard rock band AC/DC, in support of their soundtrack album, Who Made Who, which was released on 26 May 1986.

Background
The tour took place in North America, beginning in New Orleans on 30 July 1986 and ending in Uniondale, New York on 20 September. Queensrÿche were the opening act at some shows on this tour, before being replaced by Loudness.

Reception
Sharon Liveten from Billboard opened their review, stating that AC/DC continued to be one of heavy metal's most popular touring acts which proved itself still capable of delivering the goods, with the band bringing in renewed energy and life to their classic songs. However, Liveten had criticized that the band could have used a little more theatrical spice, as well as songs dragging on a lot longer than they should have.

Martin Siberok, a reporter from the Montreal Gazette, opened their review with a headline that the band had "KOed" fans, in which it had unleashed the 'true headbanger' in fans. He noted into Angus Young's interactions with the fans to keep their attention, with the band's ordinariness creating a bond between both the band and the audience in attendance with ear bleeding sound and sheer power. He later concluded his review, stating that AC/DC scored high with energy and excitement.

Opening acts
Queensrÿche
Loudness

Setlist
"Who Made Who"
"Shot Down in Flames"
"Dirty Deeds Done Dirt Cheap"
"Back in Black"
"Fly on the Wall"
"She's Got Balls"
"Jailbreak"
"The Jack"
"Shoot to Thrill"
"You Shook Me All Night Long"
"Whole Lotta Rosie"
"Let There Be Rock"
"Highway to Hell"
"T.N.T."
"Hells Bells"
"For Those About to Rock (We Salute You)"

Tour dates

Box office score data

Personnel
Angus Young – lead guitar
Cliff Williams – bass guitar, backing vocals
Malcolm Young – rhythm guitar, backing vocals
Simon Wright – drums
Brian Johnson – lead vocals

References

AC/DC concert tours
1986 concert tours